Freya Ridings is the debut album by English singer-songwriter Freya Ridings, released on 19 July 2019 through Good Soldier Songs and AWAL. It includes the singles "Lost Without You", which reached the UK top ten, as well as the lead single "Blackout", "Ultraviolet", "You Mean the World to Me" and "Castles". It was also supported by the promotional single "Unconditional". It was named one of nine albums to look forward to in 2019 by Smooth Radio. The album debuted inside the top 3 in the UK and Scotland's official charts, and has charted in countries like Germany and Ireland.

Background
Ridings stated that because the album was written over "such a long period of time", its "universal theme" is "loneliness", as she was "isolated" growing up and would play music on her school's pianos at lunchtime and "tell the kind of stories you would tell to a friend to the piano".

Commercial performance
Freya Ridings debuted on the UK Albums Chart at number three, with sales of 14,779 units.

Track listing
Adapted from iTunes.

Charts

Certifications

References

2019 debut albums
Freya Ridings albums
Albums produced by Greg Kurstin